Joseph Frank (23 December 1771, in Rastadt – 18 December 1842, in Como) was a German physician.

Biography
He was the son of physician Johann Peter Frank. He assisted his father in Pavia and Vienna, and became in 1804 a professor of pathology at Vilnius University. At Vilnius he founded a vaccination institute (1808), a maternity institute (1809) and an out-patients' clinic (1807). The Vilnius Medical Society was founded on his initiative. He retired in 1824 on account of a disease of the eyes, now thought to be pink eye.

Work
He was one of the more influential advocates of the Brunonian system of physic, and published "Grundriss der Pathologie nach den Gesetzen der Erregungstheorie" (Vienna, 1803). As his career progressed, however, he became highly critical of Brunonianism. His "Praxeos Medicæ Universæ Præcepta" (Leipzig, second edition, 1826–43) has been translated into German (9 volumes, 1828–43) and French.

References

External links
 

1771 births
1842 deaths
Academic staff of Vilnius University
19th-century German physicians
University of Pavia alumni
People from Rastatt
German expatriates in Italy
German expatriates in the Russian Empire